Questions and answers may refer to:

Music 
 Questions & Answers (album), by The Sleeping, 2006
 "Questions and Answers" (Biffy Clyro song), 2003
 "Questions and Answers" (Sham 69 song), 1979
 "Questions and Answers", a song by Nektar from Remember the Future, 1973

Television 
 Questions and Answers (TV channel) or Voprosy I Otvety, a Russian game-show channel
 Questions and Answers (TV programme), an Irish topical debate show
 "Questions and Answers" (The Golden Girls), a television episode

Other uses 
 Google Questions and Answers, a free knowledge market
 Questions and Answers, a work by Anastasius of Sinai
 Questions and Answers, a seven-volume book by Mirra Alfassa
 Erotapokriseis, Greek for 'questions and answers', a literary genre

See also 
 Question and Answer (disambiguation)
Q&A (disambiguation)
Frequently asked questions
Quiz game